is a railway station in Karatsu, Saga Prefecture, Japan. It is operated by JR Kyushu and is on the Chikuhi line.

Lines
JR Kyushu
Chikuhi Line

Layout
It is an elevated station with a single side platform. It is an unmanned station with a ticket machine and a bathroom.

Environs
Karatsu Commercial High School
Karatsu City Daigo Junior High School
Karatsu City Sotomachi Elementary School
Karatsu Watada Post office

History
1983-03-22 - Opening

Adjacent stations

Passenger statistics
In fiscal 2016, the station was used by an average of 331 passengers daily (boarding passengers only), and it ranked 296th among the busiest stations of JR Kyushu.

References 

Chikuhi Line
Railway stations in Saga Prefecture
Stations of Kyushu Railway Company